Middle Class Love  is an Indian Hindi-language romantic comedy film written by Yash Keswani and directed by Ratnaa Sinha. Produced by Anubhav Sinha, under the banner of Benaras Media Works. It stars Eisha Singh, Kavya Thapar and Prit Kamani. The film was theatrically released in India on 16 September 2022.

Cast
 Eisha Singh as Ashna Tripathi (Ash)
 Kavya Thapar as Sysha Oberoi
 Prit Kamani as Yudhishthir Sharma (Yudi)
 Manoj Pahwa as Sharmaji
 Sanjay Bishnoi
 Sapna Sand
 Omkar Kulkarni

Production
The principal photography of the film started in 2021 in Mussoorie.

Marketing and release
The trailer of the film was released on 7 August 2022. Middle Class Love was released theatrically on 16 September 2022.

The cast promoted the film on The Kapil Sharma Show.

Soundtrack 

The film's music is composed by Himesh Reshammiya while lyrics were penned by Himesh Reshammiya, Shabbir Ahmed, Shakeel Azmi and Mayur Puri. The song "Apna Karenge" was composed by Prasanna Suresh and lyrics were written by Spitfire.

Reception

Critical reception  
The film received mostly mixed reviews. Archika Khurana of Times of India gave 2.5/5 and stated "It's alight and breezy coming-of-age drama". Shubhra Gupta from Indian Express gave it a 2/5 and stated that "Like in most Bollywood movies set in these kinds of ‘schools’, no studying is done, instead the setting is just an excuse for good-looking teenagers to learn life lessons." Sonil Dedhia of News18 rated it 3/5 and stated it "a light-hearted coming-of-age story that every middle class person especially the college going kids would relate to."
Subhash K. Jha of Firstpost praised the film stating that "A surprisingly well-packaged, coming-of-age rom-com with a star turn by Prit Kamani."

References

External links 
 
 

2020s Hindi-language films
Films scored by Himesh Reshammiya
Indian romantic comedy films
2022 romantic comedy films